Larry Dyck (born December 15, 1965) is a Canadian former ice hockey goaltender played the majority of his career in the International Hockey League.

Awards
 WHL West First All-Star Team – 1986

References

External links

1965 births
Living people
Canadian expatriate ice hockey players in the United States
Canadian ice hockey goaltenders
Central Texas Stampede players
Houston Aeros (1994–2013) players
Ice hockey people from Manitoba
Kalamazoo Wings (1974–2000) players
Kansas City Blades players
Knoxville Cherokees players
Manitoba Bisons ice hockey players
Milwaukee Admirals (IHL) players
Mobile Mysticks players
Regina Pats players
Seattle Breakers players
Seattle Thunderbirds players
Sportspeople from Winkler, Manitoba